This is a list of lighthouses in Barbados. They are located close to important ports of Barbados and the eastern coast to guide ships from across the Atlantic to the relatively flat island.

Lighthouses

Notes and references

See also
 Transport in Barbados
 Lists of lighthouses and lightvessels

External links

 Amateur Radio Lighthouse Society list of lighthouses in Barbados
 Lighthouses of Barbados
 BarbadosLighthouse.com - Devoted site to the four lighthouses of Barbados
 Lighthouses of Barbados, Barbados Pocket Guide
 

 
Barbados
Barbados transport-related lists
Lists of buildings and structures in Barbados